The 1992 San Francisco 49ers season was the franchise's 43rd season in the National Football League (NFL) and their 47th overall. The 49ers appeared in the NFC Championship Game for the second time in three seasons. This was the last season the 49ers had Joe Montana on the roster. The last game he played as a 49er was the December 28 Monday Night Football game against the Detroit Lions.

Offseason

Draft

Personnel 
With the departure of Mike Holmgren to Green Bay, the 49ers hired Denver Broncos offensive assistant Mike Shanahan to run the offense. Jeff Fisher joined the coaching staff as defensive backs coach.

Staff

Roster

Regular season

Schedule

Game Summaries

Week One at New York Giants 
Steve Young completed four of six passes for 27 yards and a touchdown but was knocked out of the game; backup QB Steve Bono threw for 187 yards and two touchdowns while Ricky Watters rushed for 100 yards. Phil Simms was intercepted in the fourth quarter and the Niners scored on the pick.

Week Two vs. Buffalo Bills 

In the first NFL game ever to go without a single punt, Steve Young, Jim Kelly, and two of the most famous offenses in league history – San Francisco's West Coast offense and Buffalo's K-Gun offense – combined for 1,086 yards and 65 points as a late Niners field goal attempt missed for a 34–31 Bills win. Jerry Rice was knocked out of the game after three catches for 26 yards; Mike Sherrard led the Niners' receiving attack with 159 yards.
|Weather=  (Sunny)

Week Three at New York Jets 
The Niners returned to Giants Stadium and won 31–14 generating 335 yards of offense. Young threw for 163 yards and also rushed for fifty, nearly matching Ricky Watters's 55 yards. The Jets didn't score until the fourth quarter.

Week Four at New Orleans Saints 
The Saints held the Niners to 333 yards of offense but fumbled twice and Bobby Hebert threw three picks. Steve Young and Ricky Watters accounted for 141 rushing yards as the Niners clawed out a 16–10 win.

Week Five vs. Los Angeles Rams 
The Niners returned to The Stick and saw a 10–7 grinder explode in the fourth quarter as Robert Bailey picked off Steve Young and scored; Young followed with two rushing scores (and 60 rushing yards total, once again coming close to matching Ricky Watters's game total, here 83 yards) before Jim Everett's nine-yard score to Flipper Anderson tied the game; Mike Cofer then won it (27–24) on a late 21-yard field goal.
|Weather= (Sunny)

Week Six at New England Patriots 
Despite two fumbles and a Steve Young pick, the Niners manhandled the faltering Patriots 24–12, intercepting Hugh Millen twice and limiting the Patriots to 227 yards of offense. Young and Ricky Watters again were a two-pronged rushing attack with 173 combined yards on the ground.

Week Seven vs. Atlanta Falcons 
The Niners scored five rushing touchdowns, three of them by Watters, and put up 191 rushing yards to go with 399 passing yards from Steve Young in a 56–17 massacre of the Falcons.
|Weather=  (Cloudy)

Week Nine at Phoenix Cardinals 
Four years after one of the most frustrating losses of the Bill Walsh era, the Niners again fell to the Cardinals, this time 24–14. Chris Chandler threw three touchdowns and the Cards swallowed four Niners turnovers. The biggest highlight for San Francisco was when Mike Sherrard scored a touchdown after he grabbed the ball from Eric Hill who had recovered a fumble from Brent Jones.

Week Ten Monday Night Football at Atlanta Falcons 
The Niners responded to the Phoenix loss by unleashing three Steve Young touchdowns and a Merton Hanks punt return score while picking off Billy Joe Tolliver three times and swallowing three Falcons fumbles in a 41–3 massacre. Deion Sanders had four kick returns for 81 yards for Atlanta.

Week Eleven vs. New Orleans Saints 
The Saints picked off Steve Young once and raced to a 20–7 lead, but in the fourth quarter, Young and Brent Jones erased New Orleans's lead on two touchdowns, winning 21–20.
|Weather=  (Drizzle)

Week Twelve at Los Angeles Rams 
The Niners assault through 1992 continued as they limited the Rams to 245 yards and won 27–10. Ricky Watters erupted to 163 rushing yards and two scores.

Week Thirteen vs. Philadelphia Eagles 
Despite two Randall Cunningham touchdowns the Eagles fell 20–14 at San Francisco. Steve Young threw for 342 yards and posted the most rushing yards of the game at 26.
|Weather=  (Sunny)

Week Fourteen vs. Miami Dolphins 
Dan Marino was routed once again by the 49ers as they limited him to 192 passing yards and won 27–3. With Watters sidelined, Amp Lee led the rushing attack with 58 yards and a score.
|Weather=  (Rain)

Week Fifteen at Minnesota Vikings 
Both teams combined for just 472 yards of offense as a late Terry Allen score could get the Vikings no closer than a 20–17 Niners win. Amp Lee exploded to 134 rushing yards.

Week Sixteen vs. Tampa Bay Buccaneers 
With Steve Young facing his former team, the game lead tied or changed five times as Jerry Rice's 30-yard touchdown won the game for the Niners 21–14. The game was a clean affair with just five total penalties.
|Weather=  (Sunny)

Week Seventeen Monday Night Football vs. Detroit Lions 
Steve Young threw for 153 yards as the Niners clawed to a 7–6 halftime lead; from there Joe Montana came into the game and threw for 126 yards and two touchdowns.
|Weather=  (Light rain)

Standings

Best performances 
 Second Most Total Yards in One 49ers Game, 590 Total Yards (vs. Atlanta Falcons on October 18, 1992)

Playoffs 
The 49ers' NFC West division championship and 14–2 regular-season record earned them the #1 seed in the NFC and a first-round bye in the playoffs.

Schedule

NFC Divisional Playoff vs. Washington Redskins 

In a rain-plagued, muddy, and sloppily played game, the 49ers defeated the Redskins 20–13. The entire field was covered in mud with resulting play affected. The 49ers took a 17–3 lead at halftime, but trailed off in the second half and the Redskins kept it close. Steve Young was 20 for 30, throwing for 227 yards, but he fumbled three times (following one fumble, 49ers radio analyst Wayne Walker criticized Young's run-heavy playing style, unfavorably contrasting it with erstwhile Niners starter Joe Montana) and threw an interception. Late in the game, the Redskins were at the San Francisco 28-yard line and looking to take their first lead of the game when a hand-off by Redskins quarterback Mark Rypien to running back Brian Mitchell was fumbled and recovered by the 49ers. Both teams committed 4 turnovers each.

NFC Championship Game vs. Dallas Cowboys 

The 49ers, who struggled the previous week, did not look much better in this game as they had four turnovers while the Cowboys had none. Even with the turnovers the Niners clawed to within 24–20 on a five-yard Jerry Rice touchdown catch, but on the ensuing Cowboys' possession a 70-yard catch and run by Alvin Harper set up Troy Aikman's touchdown pass to Kelvin Martin, sealing the Cowboys' win. In all, the 49ers had eight turnovers in their two playoff games. Young finished the playoffs with a passer rating of 91.0.

Awards and records 
 Franchise Record, Most Points in One Game, 56 Points (vs. Atlanta Falcons on October 18, 1992) 
 Franchise Record, Most Total Yards in One Game, 598 Total Yards (vs. Buffalo Bills on September 13, 1992) 
 Led NFL, Points Scored, 431 Points 
 Steve Young, Led NFL, Passer Rating, 107.0 Rating 
 Steve Young, Led NFL, Touchdown Passes, 25 Passes 
 Steve Young, Bert Bell Award
 Steve Young, Miller Lite Player of the Year 
 Steve Young, NFL MVP

References

External links 
 
 49ers Schedule on jt-sw.com

San Francisco
NFC West championship seasons
San Francisco 49ers seasons
San
1992 in San Francisco